The 2016 Super TC2000 was the fifth season of the series, founded in 2012 and since that year was categorized as divisional major, compared to its pair TC2000.

Calendar

Teams and drivers
All teams and drivers were registered in Argentina.

Championships

Drivers (top 10)

Teams

Manufacturers

References

External links
 

Super TC2000
Super TC2000
TC 2000 Championship seasons